The Kogakuin Crash Machines football program represents the Kogakuin University in college football. They are members of the Kantoh Collegiate American Football Association.

External links
 

American football teams established in 1976
American football in Japan
1976 establishments in Japan